The Duquesne Dukes football team competes in the National Collegiate Athletic Association (NCAA) representing Duquesne University. The team competes in the NCAA Division I Football Championship Subdivision (FCS) and is a member of the Northeast Conference.

Seasons

Yellow = .500 record; Orange = above .500 record; Green = undefeated

1891-1892: Results Unavailable

References

Duquesne Dukes

Duquesne Dukes
Duquesne Dukes